The Voice of People Party is a political party established in November 2021 in the Indian state of Meghalaya. The party president is Ardent Miller Basaiawmoit, who won the election to the Nongkrem constituency at the 2013 election to the Meghalaya Legislative Assembly and again during the 2023 election. The party contested 14 constituencies at the 2023 Meghalaya Legislative Assembly election and won 4 seats.

References

Political parties established in 2021
Political parties in India